Fisher Ministry may refer to:

 First Fisher Ministry
 Second Fisher Ministry
 Third Fisher Ministry